USS Corypheus was a schooner captured by the Union Navy during the American Civil War.

Corypheus was used by the Union Navy primarily as a gunboat to patrol navigable waterways of the Confederacy in order to prevent the South from trading with other countries. She carried a 30-pounder rifled gun, powerful enough to stop a blockade runner, and a howitzer for riverside bombardment.

Captured by the Union Navy and placed into service 

The Confederate yacht Corypheus was captured by  13 May 1862 in Bayou Bonfuca, Louisiana.

Civil War service

Assigned to the Gulf Blockade 
 
Operating off Corpus Christi, Texas, on 12 August 1862 Corypheus participated in the capture of the armed schooner Breaker and destruction of Hannah and Elma by their own men. She took part in the engagements at Corpus Christi on 16 and 18 August, and while returning to Aransas Bay, captured the blockade runner .

Participating in the Battle of Sabine Pass 
 
Arriving at Galveston, Texas, 28 December 1862, Corypheus fired in the Battle of Sabine Pass on 1 January 1863. Corypheus fought valiantly and cleared amid a rain of fire from the enemy when the Union force withdrew.

Lake Pontchartrain assignment 
 
Her next duty was on Lake Pontchartrain where she was stationed to break up the small-craft traffic crossing between New Orleans, Louisiana, and coastal waters. She remained on this duty until November 1864 when ordered to Pensacola, Florida. Following repairs, she was stationed around Mobile, Alabama.

Post war decommissioning and sale 

After the war’s end, Corypheus was sold 15 September 1865.

References 

Ships of the Union Navy
Schooners of the United States Navy
Gunboats of the United States Navy
Tenders of the United States Navy
American Civil War patrol vessels of the United States
Captured ships
1862 ships